Hutchinson is an unincorporated community and census-designated place (CDP) located within Harmony Township in Warren County, New Jersey, United States, that was defined as part of the 2010 United States Census. As of the 2010 Census, the CDP's population was 135.

Geography
According to the United States Census Bureau, the CDP had a total area of 0.198 square miles (0.513 km2), including 0.138 square miles (0.358 km2) of land and 0.060 square miles (0.155 km2) of water (30.24%).

Demographics

Census 2010

References

Census-designated places in Warren County, New Jersey
Harmony Township, New Jersey